Nazmakan-e Olya (also Romanized as Nāzmakān-e ‘Olyā; also known as Nazkūn, Nāzmakān, Nāzmakān-e Bālā, Seyyed Jamāl Ed Dīn, and Seyyed Jamāl od Dīn) is a village in Boyer Ahmad-e Garmsiri Rural District, in the Central District of Gachsaran County, Kohgiluyeh and Boyer-Ahmad Province, Iran. At the 2006 census, its population was 103, in 22 families.

References 

Populated places in Gachsaran County